Emma Hindle (born 19 May 1975) is a British international equestrian. She first rode for her country in 2004, competing in the World Equestrian Games of that year, and competed for Great Britain in Dressage at both the Athens and Beijing Olympic Games.

Early life
Hindle was born in Preston, Lancashire on 19 May 1975, the daughter of multimillionaire property developer John Hindle. After riding a donkey on the beach at Blackpool aged four, she began taking regular riding lessons at her aunt's stables. She began competitive showing in Working hunter classes, followed by eventing.

Career
Aged 12, Hindle was under instruction from international dressage judge Stephen Clarke and at 18 she moved to Sweden to train with Kyra Kyrklund at the Flyinge Stud.

When Kyrklund moved to the UK in 1993, Hindle moved to the base of Netherlands Olympic dressage medallist Ellen Bontje in Frankfurt, Germany. It was from this base that she competed in the Beijing Olympics.

Now running the Brookhouse Stud in Erbach, Hessen, Hindle is part of the London 2012 World Class Performance Programme.

Results

Personal life
She has a son Luke, and following her father's death, she is running his property business.

References

External links
Team GB Profile
Brookhouse stud

1975 births
Living people
Sportspeople from Preston, Lancashire
British dressage riders
British expatriate sportspeople in Sweden
British expatriates in Germany
Olympic equestrians of Great Britain
British female equestrians
Equestrians at the 2004 Summer Olympics
Equestrians at the 2008 Summer Olympics